Vileyka District is the second-level administrative subdivision (raion) of Belarus in the north-west of Minsk Region. The capital of the town is Vileyka.

Notable residents 

 Janka Filistovič (1926, Paniacičy village  - 1953), active participant in the Belarusian independence movement and a member of the underground anti-Soviet resistance in Belarus in the 1950s.
 Piotra Sych(1912, Baturyna village - 1963) - Belarusian writer and journalist, a Gulag prisoner

References

 
Districts of Minsk Region